The Sacred Mound is a 1993 Icelandic drama film directed by Hrafn Gunnlaugsson. The film was selected as the Icelandic entry for the Best Foreign Language Film at the 66th Academy Awards, but was not accepted as a nominee.

Cast
 Steinþór Rafn Matthíasson as Gestur
 Alda Sigurðardóttir as Helga
 Helgi Skúlason as Helga's Father
 Tinna Finnbogadóttir as Kolla
 Valdimar Örn Flygenring as Hjalmtyr
 Agneta Prytz as Gestur's Grandmother
 Edda Björgvinsdóttir as Gestur's Mother

See also
 List of submissions to the 66th Academy Awards for Best Foreign Language Film
 List of Icelandic submissions for the Academy Award for Best Foreign Language Film

References

External links
 

1993 films
1993 drama films
1990s Icelandic-language films
Films directed by Hrafn Gunnlaugsson
Icelandic drama films